Sachsendreier can mean the following:

 a postage stamp issued in 1850, see Sachsen 3 Pfennige red
 a formation of three rock bands from Saxony, namely Electra, Stern Meißen, and Lift